Pleasant Point is a small country town in southern Canterbury, New Zealand, some 19 km inland from Timaru, on State Highway 8. It is a service town for the surrounding farming district. One of its main attractions is the heritage railway, the Pleasant Point Museum and Railway, which operates steam locomotives and one of only two Model T Ford railcar replicas in the world. It attracts about 10,000 people a year.  For almost one hundred years, the Fairlie branch line railway passed through the town.  It closed on 2 March 1968, and the heritage line utilises 2.5 km of track along the branch's old route.

Pleasant Point is also known for glassblowing, taxidermy, blacksmithing and  custard squares, and Māori rock art can be viewed nearby.  Vineyards have also been established in the area. It also has two primary schools, a preschool and a play centre. Pleasant Point High School was closed by the Labour government in 2004.
It has two rivers nearby, the Opihi and the TeNgawai; the two rivers meet just to the north of the town.

A 1901 census placed the town's population at 749.

Naming

"Pleasant Point" was not always the town's name, during the early 1800s wagoners would travel from Timaru to the Mackenzie Country, to access its rich hunting grounds. These trips would take three to six weeks for a return trip, as the land was mainly tussock, flaxes and matagouri, with few tracks. These wagoners would stop at camps along the way, a popular one being "The Point." The "point" itself is unknown and often left up to speculation and theories. These include the "point" being the place at which the TeNgawai and Opihi rivers meet. One theory suggests the "point is the cut in the hill, possible at the foot of Manse Road, as this is where the town grew from. "The Point" grew into one of the most popular camps along the route. Campers started referring to it as "Pleasant Point" due to its access to food and water for the horses, a fully stocked hotel and pleasant surroundings.

Street names
As early as 1870 the streets of Pleasant Point had been named and surveyed, although these names were not publicised, and this led to many streets being referred to by landmarks. Halstead Road was often called School Road, due to the school being located there. Harris Street was known as Church Street as it was the location of the first Anglican church. The Main Road was often referred to as Dominion Street, presumably linked to New Zealand's declaration as a Dominion.

However as the township began to grow, street names became a necessity and streets were signposted.  The town was divided up into sections. Streets to the south of the railway line have Afghan names. This is presumably linked to the Anglo-Afghan wars that were making the news at the time. The streets in the northern part of the town are named after early settlers to the area or notable people who own property in the locality. William Halstead was a fellmonger who owned land on Halstead Road. John Porter Harris owned the land on Harris Street, although early maps call the street Le Cren Street after Henry John Le Cren who used to own the land. The streets in the western part are named after native trees.

Demographics
Pleasant Point is described by Statistics New Zealand as a small urban area.

Pleasant Point had a population of 1,371 at the 2018 New Zealand census, an increase of 69 people (5.3%) since the 2013 census, and an increase of 177 people (14.8%) since the 2006 census. There were 558 households. There were 696 males and 675 females, giving a sex ratio of 1.03 males per female. The median age was 44.5 years (compared with 37.4 years nationally), with 270 people (19.7%) aged under 15 years, 198 (14.4%) aged 15 to 29, 630 (46.0%) aged 30 to 64, and 273 (19.9%) aged 65 or older.

Ethnicities were 93.2% European/Pākehā, 10.7% Māori, 0.7% Pacific peoples, 1.3% Asian, and 2.4% other ethnicities (totals add to more than 100% since people could identify with multiple ethnicities).

The proportion of people born overseas was 9.6%, compared with 27.1% nationally.

Although some people objected to giving their religion, 50.5% had no religion, 37.9% were Christian and 1.5% had other religions.

Of those at least 15 years old, 138 (12.5%) people had a bachelor or higher degree, and 282 (25.6%) people had no formal qualifications. The median income was $31,300, compared with $31,800 nationally. The employment status of those at least 15 was that 528 (48.0%) people were employed full-time, 195 (17.7%) were part-time, and 33 (3.0%) were unemployed.

Saleyards

Early on, Pleasant Point was recognised as a centre for buying and selling stock. The first stockmarket in South Canterbury was held in Pleasant Point on 8 December 1871.

A report in the Timaru Herald on 2 November 1881 read as follows:

On Monday, the yards erected by the Pleasant Point Saleyards Company were opened. The capacity of the cattle yards was fully tested by an entry of four hundred head and the opinion was freely expressed that the Company will require to complete their original design. This they have been unable to do through the want of support by a number of persons who entered cordially into the preliminary arrangements and have not taken up shares so freely as the management was led to anticipate.
The commodious sheep pens were not greatly patronised, the present season not being favourable for large sales of sheep but this department is pretty certain to be a prominent feature in future sales.
Having secured a site of four acres, the Directors have provided for ample development which may be fairly predicted for the business of a centre commanding such a large and agriculturally thriving district. The Levels Road Board have lately removed a very narrow bridge in the immediate vicinity and erected a substantial structure giving free access to the Company‘s grounds.
The auctioneers were Jones, Wildie, Allan and Stumbles and Maclean and Stewart and, with the very large attendance, the day's proceedings were probably satisfactory. The Directors have arranged a very liberal scale of charges for travelling stock, drafting purposes, etc., and there is no doubt shareholders will be handsomely paid for their enterprises.

By 1896 the saleyards were the largest in South Canterbury; by 1905 they were the second largest saleyards in Canterbury, behind Addington in Christchurch. In the early 1970s the Pleasant Point directors approached the Temuka Saleyard Company with the suggestion of the two companies amalgamating, and in 1979 the Pleasant Point Saleyards closed.

Cyclemakers

The Cyclemakers Group started production in Pleasant Point in October 1981 with Ian Hooker as managing director.

The firm started off with ten staff, and designed and manufactured bicycles on a Te Ngawai Road site. By 1989 the business employed around 35 people. The factory was completely destroyed by fire in April 1990 and the firm then relocated to Washdyke.

Education 
Pleasant Point currently has 2 primary schools and a preschool. 

Pleasant Point Primary School is a full primary for years 1 to 8 with a roll of  students as of 

St Joseph's School is a Catholic state-integrated primary for years 1 to 8 with a roll of  students as of 

Pleasant Point High also existed until 2004, when it was closed by the government.  This closure meant high  school students had to go to other schools, primarily in Timaru. A school in Pleasant Point was first suggested and opened in 1868. It was located on Tengawai Road. By 1871 the school had been moved to a new location on Harris Street, although the school soon exceeded the available facilities and an extra room was added, by which time the school had a capacity for 200 students. In 1907 a new school was built on seven acres, at its current location on Halstead Road.

In 1911, 200 trees were planted alongside the playground as a memorial to the coronation of King George V.

In 1927, St Josephs opened.

In 2004 the government closed the high school, which resulted in much of the school resources being given to the adjacent primary school and the remainder being sold off. The primary school under went massive changes, with the school expanded to years 0-8 to include the intermediate students who would have attended the high school. A number of builds were also used to expand the school, whilst the gym and neighbouring courts became public for the community. The remaining buildings were sold off and eventually formed the new pre-school.

In 2018 the old concrete tennis and basketball courts outside the gymnasium were renovated to include a new artificial turf which could accommodate many different sports, including hockey, netball, and tennis.

Disaster
On 13 March 1986 Pleasant Point lay witness to the worst flood in South Canterbury's history. The flood caused people in the western part of the town to be evacuated. Up to five helicopters were operating to get people to dry ground. The flood caused millions of dollars in damages.

See also
Totara Valley
 Raincliff
 Waitohi

References

External links
 1868-1948 : Pleasant Point District High School (1948)
 Pleasant Point - A History by Olwyn Oliver (1989)
 Pleasant Point at the Timaru District Council
 Pleasant Point at Central South Island Tourism
 Pleasant Point Railway & Historical Society
 Teara, South Canterbury Places
 The Cyclopedia of New Zealand, Canterbury Provinces
 https://archive.org/stream/PPDHS1868to1948/PPDHS-1868to1948_djvu.txt

Timaru District
Populated places in Canterbury, New Zealand